USS Shasta (AE-33) was a Kilauea-class replenishment ammunition ship of the United States Navy. She was named after Mount Shasta, a volcano in the Cascade Range in northern California. Shastas mission was to support forward deployed aircraft carrier battle groups, which she accomplished through underway replenishment (known as "unrep") and vertical replenishment (known as "vertrep"). Over three decades, Shasta and her crew took part in the  Vietnam War, the Cold War, the Iran–Iraq War, Desert Shield/Operation Desert Storm, and numerous other actions.

To accomplish her underway replenishment mission, Shasta utilized seven underway replenishment stations utilizing the Standard Tensioned Replenishment Alongside Method (STREAM), and utilized four cargo booms to load and unload cargo. To accomplish her vertical replenishment mission, Shasta embarked two CH-46 Sea Knight helicopters together with their air and maintenance crews; Shastas ship's company ran the flight deck and tower. Shastas Deck Department was among the best in the United States Pacific Fleet.

Construction and commissioning 
Shastas keel was laid down 10 November 1969 at the Ingalls shipyard in Pascagoula, Mississippi, sponsored by Mrs. Ralph W. Cousins, wife of the Vice Chief of Naval Operations. She was launched on 3 April 1971. Upon completion, the builder took her to Charleston, South Carolina and delivered her to the Navy. Shasta was commissioned in Charleston on 4 February 1972.

Shasta was a combat logistics ship whose primary missions were underway replenishment ("UNREP"), where it passed cargo and supplies to other warships steaming alongside close aboard, and vertical replenishment ("VERTREP"), where helicopters would transfer cargo to nearby ships. The main supplies transferred by Shasta was ammunition (bombs, missiles, etc.), but she also transferred significant quantities of fuel oil (Diesel Fuel Marine, or DFM, also known as NATO F76), spare parts, food, dry goods and personnel.

Shastas initial armament included four twin 3"/50 caliber gun mounts and multiple .50 caliber machine gun positions.

One of Shastas innovations was a covered main deck, which allowed for protected cargo handling operations, and fork truck use from the flight deck to the forward cargo holds and unrep stations.

For a ship of its large size, Shasta had an interesting engineering design.  It had three 600 psi steam boilers and only one propeller, and a prominent bulbous bow.

1970s – entering service and Vietnam 
After fitting out, the newly commissioned Shasta departed Charleston on 22 May 1972 for her shakedown cruise and training at Guantanamo Bay, Cuba. After completing shakedown and training on 10 June, she headed for the Pacific, where her new homeport was to be the Naval Weapons Station in Concord, California. Along the way, she made port visits to Kingston, Jamaica; Cartagena, Colombia; Panama City, Canal Zone; and Acapulco, Mexico. She passed through the Panama Canal and finally arrived in Concord on 3 July.

After arrival in Concord, she underwent ship's qualification trials and final contract trials. Upon completion of trials and preparations for deployment, Shasta departed Concord to join the 7th Fleet in the western Pacific (WestPac in US Navy terminology) on 3 January 1973 in support of operations off Vietnam during the Vietnam War, returning to Concord in July 1973.

Shasta made additional WestPac deployments:
 July–December 1974
 April–November 1977
 September 1978 – April 1979
 September 1979 – June 1980, with HC-11 Detachment 7 embarked with two CH-46 helicopters

During the 1979–1980 deployment, Shasta deployed as part of a task force in the Indian Ocean/Arabian Sea off the coast of Iran during the Iranian hostage crisis, for which it received the Navy Expeditionary Medal.

1980s – Western Pacific and the Middle East

Armament 
Shastas armament was upgraded during the Cold War to include chaff and two Vulcan Phalanx CIWS 20MM Gatling gun close-in weapon systems for missile defense and AN/SLQ-25 Nixie for anti-torpedo defense. During the 1980s Shasta conducted many Cold War operations, and many operations related to United States interests in the Iran–Iraq War.

Deployments during the early 1980s 
Shasta made the following deployments during the early 1980s:
 September 1981 – April 1982: Western Pacific & Indian Ocean/North Arabian Sea with HC-11 Detachment 7 embarked with two CH-46D helicopters. During this deployment, Shasta rescued 298 Vietnamese and Cambodian refugees in the South China Sea, for which Shasta's crew received the Humanitarian Service Medal.
 September 1982 – April 1983: Western Pacific & Indian Ocean/North Arabian Sea. Port Calls included: Hawaii, Guam, Japan, Philippines, Hong Kong, Korea and Thailand. Also, extended operations in the Indian Ocean/Persian Gulf. Helicopter Combat Support Squadron Eleven (HC-11) Detachment One from Naval Air Station North Island, San Diego California – Deployed for Support Operations, with Two Boeing HH-46A Sea Knight Helicopters.

1985 deployment to Western Pacific and Middle East 
Shasta deployed to the Western Pacific and Indian Oceans in 1985 under the command of Commander Barry N. Kaye to support United States interests in the Iran–Iraq War. Shasta deployed as part of the  battle group Brovo. Shasta supported the Kitty Hawk battle group in the North Arabian Sea and Gulf of Oman off the entrance to the Strait of Hormuz. The ship and her crew made port calls at Mombasa, Kenya, Subic Bay Naval Base, and Pearl Harbor, Hawaii, and conducted airhead operations at al-Masirah, Oman. The crew earned the Sea Service Deployment Ribbon for its service on the deployment.

Carl Vinson download 
In February 1986, Shasta conducted download operations with the  battle group in the Gulf of Alaska. Shasta conducted these operations during a major winter storm in the Gulf of Alaska.

1987 deployment to Western Pacific and Middle East 
This included three months on station off the coast of Iran and the Hormuz Strait with the Task Force in Gonzo Station.

During the deployment Shasta conducted many airhead operations at al-Masirah, Oman. During its time on station, Shasta sortied to rearm destroyers in support of Operation Nimble Archer. Also during this deployment, Shasta made port visits at Lualualei in Pearl Harbor, Hawaii; Subic Bay, Luzon, Philippines (two); Singapore; Diego Garcia, British Indian Ocean Territories; Pattaya, Thailand; and Hong Kong. Shasta was also involved in Cold War operations during the deployment, and had frequent contact with Soviet vessels and aircraft. Shasta transited the Northern, Eastern and Western Pacific Ocean the San Bernardino Strait; the South China Sea; the Straits of Malacca; the Bay of Bengal; the Singapore Strait; the northern and southern Indian Ocean; the Gulf of Thailand; the Philippine Sea; the North Arabian Sea; the Gulf of Oman; and into the mouth of the Strait of Hormuz. Shastas crew was awarded the Armed Forces Expeditionary Medal and the Sea Service Deployment Ribbon for their service on this deployment. During the deployment, en route from Thailand to Hong Kong, Shasta sailed through a super typhoon in the South China Sea, sustaining damage, but never reducing her operational capacity. During this deployment, Shasta steamed 44,633 nautical miles, and at one point spent 79 consecutive days at sea on station off the coast of Iran, most at condition III (wartime steaming). Shasta crossed the Equator in the Indian Ocean en route to Diego Garcia and held a line-crossing ceremony and initiated the shellbacks into the solemn mysteries of the Ancient Order of the Deep.

Drug interdiction operations 
In 1988, Shasta supported drug smuggling interdiction operations off Baja California, and conducted a "show the flag" port visit in Mazatlán, Mexico.

1989 deployment to Bering Sea and Western Pacific 

In 1989, under the command of Commander Daniel A. Gabe, Shasta deployed independently to the Gulf of Alaska, Aleutian Islands, and Bering Sea during PACEX 89 as a show of force against the Soviet Union. Thereafter, Shasta deployed independently to the Western Pacific, South China Sea, East China Sea and Philippine Sea for logistics operations in Eastern Asia, all for Cold War operations. During this deployment, Shasta conducted airhead operations at Cold Bay, Alaska and King Cove, Alaska (both on the Alaskan Peninsula), and Amchitka, Alaska (in the Rat Islands of the Aleutian Chain). Shasta transited the San Bernardino Strait, Amchitka Pass, Unimak Pass, and the Andreanof Islands. Shasta made port calls at Guam; Subic Bay, Luzon, Philippines; Hong Kong; Okinawa; Sasebo, Japan; Yokosuka, Japan; and Pearl Harbor. When Shasta arrived in Hong Kong, the crew learned that the Berlin Wall had fallen, one of the final episodes of the Cold War. Shasta maneuvered through a major winter storm during its transit of the Bering Sea, and engaged in typhoon evasion in the Philippine Sea, San Bernardino Strait and South China Sea; Luzon sustained significant damage from the typhoon.

Shastas crew received a Meritorious Unit Commendation and Sea Service Deployment Ribbon for their service on this deployment. While Shasta was deployed, its home port, the San Francisco Bay Area was hit by the Loma Prieta earthquake, which affected the families of many crew members. The face of the city to which the crew returned had changed considerably. They were prominent reasons for the success of Shastas deployment.

Shipyards 
Shasta underwent major overhauls on the San Francisco waterfront in 1986 and 1988, including several months in dry dock in 1988.

Homeport 
Shastas home port was Concord Naval Weapons Station, on the Suisun Bay in the Sacramento River. However, Shasta spent much of its inport time at Mare Island Naval Shipyard on the Napa River in Vallejo, California; Naval Air Station Alameda in Alameda, California on the South San Francisco Bay; and Naval Supply Center, Oakland and Oakland Army Base, both in Oakland, California also on the South San Francisco Bay. Shasta also spent several months every two years at various shipyards on the south San Francisco waterfront. This situation of going to sea from one port and returning to another led to many logistical difficulties for the ship's crew.

Blessing of the Fleet and community involvement 
Shasta had a special relationship with the Benicia Yacht Club, in Benicia, California, and participated in many of its Blessing of the Fleet ceremonies in the Carquinez Strait of the Sacramento River, leading to many memorable festivities. Shasta also participated in Fleet Week in San Francisco Bay.

Shasta's crew participated in community events in Shasta, California, her namesake city and near her namesake Mount Shasta, and extinct volcano in Northern California, including Shasta's honor guard marching in holiday parades.

Shasta trained midshipmen from NROTC and the United States Naval Academy. Shasta also hosted "tiger cruises" for family members and Navy veterans through the Navy League.

1990s – Desert Storm and transfer to MSC

Shipyards 
In early 1990, Shasta underwent a major shipyard overhaul on the San Francisco waterfront, and conducted sea trials in May 1990. Among other upgrades, the berthing compartments were upgraded to accommodate approximately 45 enlisted women.

Operation Desert Storm – First Iraq War 
Shasta deployed in support of Operations Desert Storm and Desert Shield from December 1990 to June 1991.

Last operations 
Shasta deployed to the Western Pacific, Indian Ocean and Persian Gulf in 1993. Shasta underwent shipyard overhaul, including dry dock from January through June 1994. Shasta also deployed to the Western Pacific, Indian Ocean and Persian Gulf from November 1995 through June 1996. This was Shasta's last deployment before her decommissioning transfer to Military Sealift Command. Commander Carol M. Pottenger was the ships captain between 8 March 1996 and 1 August 1997.

Transfer to Military Sealift Command 

Shasta was decommissioned on 1 October 1997 as a "United States Ship" and transferred to the Fleet Auxiliary Force of the Military Sealift Command (MSC) as a "United States Naval Ship".  On the same day, her hull number was changed and she became USNS Shasta (T-AE-33).  Shasta served in the Pacific and Indian Oceans for MSC.

Fate 
Shasta was inactivated on 21 April 2011 and transferred the reserve fleet, resting in reserve in Pearl Harbor, Hawaii.

In 2013, Shasta was towed from Pearl Harbor to Brownsville, Texas, where, as of November 2013, she was in preparation to be scrapped.

The Navy donated Shastas anchor to the city of Crowley, Texas. In April 2014 it was placed in Crowley's Veterans Plaza. Crowley's veterans and citizens have established a great relationship with Shastas veterans.

Crossing the Line 
Shasta crossed the Equator, and her crew were initiated as Shellbacks by King Neptune and his royal scribe, Davey Jones, during Crossing the Line ceremonies on the following dates:
 March 1976
 April 1977
 March 1981
 October 1985
 November 1987
 May 1991

Notable alumni 
 Rear Admiral Frank A. Morneau, Commander, Navy Expeditionary Combat Command (Second Division Officer on Shasta)

Awards and commendations 
Shasta received the following awards:
 Vietnam Service Medal
 Sea Service Deployment Ribbon: 1982–1983, 1985, 1987, 1989, 1991
 Armed Forces Expeditionary Medal (3): 1987 (Operation Earnest Will)
 Navy Unit Commendation: 1989, 1991
 Navy Meritorious Unit Commendation (4)
 Navy E Ribbon (2)
 Navy Expeditionary Medal (2-Iran/Indian Ocean)
 National Defense Service Medal (2): Vietnam, Desert Storm/Desert Shield
 Southwest Asia Service Medal
 Global War on Terrorism Expeditionary Medal
 Humanitarian Service Medal (4)
 Kuwait Liberation Medal (Kuwait)

In popular culture 
 Shasta figured prominently in Tom Clancy's 1989 novel Clear and Present Danger. In the novel, Shasta delivered the weapons that were dropped on a meeting of Colombian drug lords.

References

External links 

 

Kilauea-class ammunition ships
Ships built in Pascagoula, Mississippi
1971 ships
Mount Shasta